Juniel Alberto Querecuto (born September 19, 1992) is a Venezuelan professional baseball infielder in the St. Louis Cardinals organization. He has played in Major League Baseball (MLB) for the Tampa Bay Rays.

Professional career

Tampa Bay Rays
Querecuto signed with the Tampa Bay Rays organization as an international free agent on July 2, 2009. In 2010, he made his professional baseball debut with the Gulf Coast League Rays. In 46 games, Querecuto batted .251 and recorded 11 runs batted in (RBI). In 2011, he was assigned to the Short Season-A Hudson Valley Renegades, and hit .241 with 24 RBI in 70 games. Querecuto continued to advance through the Rays minor league system, spending the entire 2012 season with the Class-A Bowling Green Hot Rods. He played in 106 games, batting .249 with 32 RBI.

Querecuto did not play at any level in 2013. In 2014, he was assigned to Bowling Green to open the season, and earned a promotion to the Advanced-A Charlotte Stone Crabs of the Florida State League in July. Appearing in a career-high 115 games, Querecuto hit .271 with two home runs and 45 RBI. In the offseason, he played for the Cardenales de Lara of the Venezuelan Winter League. He began the 2015 season with Charlotte, but later was promoted to the Double-A Montgomery Biscuits and Triple-A Durham Bulls. Querecuto recorded a .256 batting average with two home runs and 34 RBI in 89 games spread across all three levels. He played in 53 games for the Cardenales in the offseason, hitting .352 and 19 RBI. In 96 games with Montgomery and Durham in 2016, Querecuto batted .241 with three home runs and 38 RBI.

Querecuto was called up to the major leagues for the first time on September 21, 2016. He made his major league debut the next day. Querecuto appeared in four games for the Rays in 2016, and went 1-for-11 at the plate with a two-run triple.

San Francisco Giants
Querecuto signed a minor league contract with the San Francisco Giants on November 19, 2016. He elected free agency on November 6, 2017.

Arizona Diamondbacks
Querecuto signed with the Diamondbacks in March 2018 as a minor league free agent and was assigned to the Double-A Jackson Generals. He was named a Southern League All-Star at midseason. He resigned on a minor league deal on November 2, 2020.

Querecuto spent the 2021 season with the Triple-A Reno Aces. He played in 96 games, hitting .301 with 13 home runs and 79 RBI's. He became a free agent following the season.

Cincinnati Reds
On January 11, 2022, Querecuto signed a minor league contract with an invitation to spring training with the Cincinnati Reds.

St. Louis Cardinals
On November 18, 2022, Querecuto signed a minor league deal with the St. Louis Cardinals.

Personal life
His father, Juan Querecuto, played 13 seasons with the Cardenales de Lara.

See also
 List of Major League Baseball players from Venezuela

References

External links

1992 births
Living people
Bowling Green Hot Rods players
Cardenales de Lara players
Charlotte Stone Crabs players
Durham Bulls players
Gulf Coast Rays players
Hudson Valley Renegades players
Jackson Generals (Southern League) players
Major League Baseball infielders
Major League Baseball players from Venezuela
Montgomery Biscuits players
Reno Aces players
Sacramento River Cats players
Tampa Bay Rays players
Venezuelan expatriate baseball players in the United States
Venezuelan expatriate baseball players in Panama
Sportspeople from Barquisimeto